Margaret "Margie" Castro (born August 22, 1959), also known as Margaret Castro-Gomez, is a former Olympic-level female judo athlete for the United States from Manhattan, New York.

Competitive career
In 1977, at the age of 17, she made history by becoming the youngest woman to win the International Championships. She is an 11-time national champion who competed against the likes of fellow American Maureen Braziel during her competitive career. She won the open weight class but gained silver at the 1987 Pan American Games, losing to Nilmaris Santini. She won three world championships by the time she went to the 1988 Olympics where judo was a demonstration sport and she won a Bronze Medal in the +72 kg division, coached by Rusty Kanokogi. This ended her competitive career. She was inducted  to the USA Judo Hall of Fame.

See also

 1987 World Judo Championships
 1984 World Judo Championships
 1982 World Judo Championships
 Judo at the 1983 Pan American Games

References

Living people
Judoka trainers
American female judoka
Judoka at the 1988 Summer Olympics
Olympic judoka of the United States
1959 births
World judo champions
Sportspeople from Brooklyn
Pan American Games gold medalists for the United States
Pan American Games silver medalists for the United States
Pan American Games medalists in judo
Judoka at the 1983 Pan American Games
Judoka at the 1987 Pan American Games
Medalists at the 1983 Pan American Games
Medalists at the 1987 Pan American Games
21st-century American women